Diadegma agens is a wasp first described by Henry Keith Townes, Jr. in 1964. No subspecies are listed.

References

External links

agens
Insects described in 1964